Italo Calvino (also , ; 15 October 1923 – 19 September 1985) was an Italian writer and journalist. His best known works include the Our Ancestors trilogy (1952–1959), the Cosmicomics collection of short stories (1965), and the novels Invisible Cities (1972) and If on a winter's night a traveler (1979).

Admired in Britain, Australia and the United States, he was the most translated contemporary Italian writer at the time of his death.

Italo Calvino is buried in the garden cemetery of Castiglione della Pescaia, in Tuscany.

Biography

Parents
Italo Calvino was born in Santiago de las Vegas, a suburb of Havana, Cuba, in 1923. His father, Mario, was a tropical agronomist and botanist who also taught agriculture and floriculture. Born 47 years earlier in Sanremo, Italy, Mario Calvino had emigrated to Mexico in 1909 where he took up an important position with the Ministry of Agriculture. In an autobiographical essay, Italo Calvino explained that his father "had been in his youth an anarchist, a follower of Kropotkin and then a Socialist Reformist". In 1917, Mario left for Cuba to conduct scientific experiments, after living through the Mexican Revolution.

Calvino's mother, Giuliana Luigia Evelina "Eva" Mameli, was a botanist and university professor. A native of Sassari in Sardinia and 11 years younger than her husband, she married while still a junior lecturer at Pavia University.  Born into a secular family, Eva was a pacifist educated in the "religion of civic duty and science". Eva gave Calvino his unusual first name to remind him of his Italian heritage, although since he wound up growing up in Italy after all, Calvino thought his name sounded "belligerently nationalist". Calvino described his parents as being "very different in personality from one another", suggesting perhaps deeper tensions behind a comfortable, albeit strict, middle-class upbringing devoid of conflict. As an adolescent, he found it hard relating to poverty and the working-class, and was "ill at ease" with his parents' openness to the labourers who filed into his father's study on Saturdays to receive their weekly paycheck.

Early life and education
In 1925, less than two years after Calvino's birth, the family returned to Italy and settled permanently in Sanremo on the Ligurian coast. Calvino's brother Floriano, who became a distinguished geologist, was born in 1927.

The family divided their time between the Villa Meridiana, an experimental floriculture station which also served as their home, and Mario's ancestral land at San Giovanni Battista. On this small working farm set in the hills behind Sanremo, Mario pioneered in the cultivation of then exotic fruits such as avocado and grapefruit, eventually obtaining an entry in the Dizionario biografico degli italiani for his achievements. The vast forests and luxuriant fauna omnipresent in Calvino's early fiction such as The Baron in the Trees derive from this "legacy". In an interview, Calvino stated that "San Remo continues to pop out in my books, in the most diverse pieces of writing." He and Floriano would climb the tree-rich estate and perch for hours on the branches reading their favorite adventure stories. Less salubrious aspects of this "paternal legacy" are described in The Road to San Giovanni, Calvino's memoir of his father in which he exposes their inability to communicate: "Talking to each other was difficult. Both verbose by nature, possessed of an ocean of words, in each other's presence we became mute, would walk in silence side by side along the road to San Giovanni." A fan of Rudyard Kipling's The Jungle Book as a child, Calvino felt that his early interest in stories made him the "black sheep" of a family that held literature in less esteem than the sciences. Fascinated by American movies and cartoons, he was equally attracted to drawing, poetry, and theatre. On a darker note, Calvino recalled that his earliest memory was of a Marxist professor who had been brutally assaulted by Benito Mussolini's Blackshirts:  "I remember clearly that we were at dinner when the old professor came in with his face beaten up and bleeding, his bowtie all torn up over it, asking for help."

Other legacies include the parents' beliefs in Freemasonry, Republicanism with elements of Anarchism and Marxism. Austere freethinkers with an intense hatred of the ruling National Fascist Party, Eva and Mario also refused to give their sons any education in the Catholic Faith or any other religion. Italo attended the English nursery school St George's College, followed by a Protestant elementary private school run by Waldensians. His secondary schooling, with a classical lyceum curriculum, was completed at the state-run Liceo Gian Domenico Cassini where, at his parents' request, he was exempted from religion classes but frequently asked to justify his anti-conformism to teachers, janitors, and fellow pupils. In his mature years, Calvino described the experience as having made him "tolerant of others' opinions, particularly in the field of religion, remembering how irksome it was to hear myself mocked because I did not follow the majority's beliefs". In 1938, Eugenio Scalfari, who went on to found the weekly magazine L'Espresso and La Repubblica, a major Italian newspaper, came from Civitavecchia to join the same class though a year younger, and they shared the same desk. The two teenagers formed a lasting friendship, Calvino attributing his political awakening to their university discussions. Seated together "on a huge flat stone in the middle of a stream near our land", he and Scalfari founded a university movement called the MUL.

Eva managed to delay her son's enrolment in the Party's armed scouts, the Balilla Moschettieri, and then arranged that he be excused, as a non-Catholic, from performing devotional acts in Church. But later on, as a compulsory member, he could not avoid the assemblies and parades of the Avanguardisti, and was forced to participate in the Italian invasion of the French Riviera in June 1940.

World War II
In 1941, Calvino enrolled at the University of Turin, choosing the Agriculture Faculty where his father had previously taught courses in agronomy. Concealing his literary ambitions to please his family, he passed four exams in his first year while reading anti-Fascist works by Elio Vittorini, Eugenio Montale, Cesare Pavese, Johan Huizinga, and Pisacane, and works by Max Planck, Werner Heisenberg, and Albert Einstein on physics. Calvino's real aspiration was to be a playwright. His letters to Eugenio Scalfari overflow with references to Italian and foreign plays, and with plots and characters of future theatrical projects. Luigi  Pirandello and Gabriele D'Annunzio, Cesare Vico Lodovici and Ugo Betti,  Eugene O'Neill and Thornton Wilder are among the main authors Calvino cites as his sources of inspiration. Disdainful of Turin students, Calvino saw himself as enclosed in a "provincial shell" that offered the illusion of immunity from the Fascist nightmare: "We were ‘hard guys’ from the provinces, hunters, snooker-players, show-offs, proud of our lack of intellectual sophistication, contemptuous of any patriotic or military rhetoric, coarse in our speech, regulars in the brothels, dismissive of any romantic sentiment and desperately devoid of women."

Calvino transferred to the University of Florence in 1943 and reluctantly passed three more exams in agriculture. By the end of the year, the Germans had succeeded in occupying Liguria and setting up Benito Mussolini's puppet Republic of Salò in northern Italy. Now twenty years old, Calvino refused military service and went into hiding. Reading intensely in a wide array of subjects, he also reasoned politically that, of all the partisan groupings, the communists were the best organized with "the most convincing political line".

In spring 1944, Eva encouraged her sons to enter the Italian Resistance in the name of "natural justice and family virtues". Using the nom de guerre "Santiago", Calvino joined the Garibaldi Brigades, a clandestine Communist group and, for twenty months, endured the fighting in the Maritime Alps until 1945 and the Liberation. As a result of his refusal to be a conscript, his parents were held hostage by the Nazis for an extended period at the Villa Meridiana. Calvino wrote of his mother's ordeal that "she was an example of tenacity and courage… behaving with dignity and firmness before the SS and the Fascist militia, and in her long detention as a hostage, not least when the blackshirts three times pretended to shoot my father in front of her eyes. The historical events which mothers take part in acquire the greatness and invincibility of natural phenomena".

Turin and communism
Calvino settled in Turin in 1945, after a long hesitation over living there or in Milan. He often humorously belittled this choice, describing Turin as a "city that is serious but sad". Returning to university, he abandoned Agriculture for the Arts Faculty. A year later, he was initiated into the literary world by Elio Vittorini, who published his short story "Andato al comando" (1945; "Gone to Headquarters") in Il Politecnico, a Turin-based weekly magazine associated with the university. The horror of the war had not only provided the raw material for his literary ambitions but deepened his commitment to the Communist cause. Viewing civilian life as a continuation of the partisan struggle, he confirmed his membership of the Italian Communist Party. On reading Vladimir Lenin's State and Revolution, he plunged into post-war political life, associating himself chiefly with the worker's movement in Turin.

In 1947, he graduated with a Master's thesis on Joseph Conrad, wrote short stories in his spare time, and landed a job in the publicity department at the Einaudi publishing house run by Giulio Einaudi. Although brief, his stint put him in regular contact with Cesare Pavese, Natalia Ginzburg, Norberto Bobbio, and many other left-wing intellectuals and writers. He then left Einaudi to work as a journalist for the official Communist daily, L'Unità, and the newborn Communist political magazine, Rinascita. During this period, Pavese and poet Alfonso Gatto were Calvino's closest friends and mentors.

His first novel, Il sentiero dei nidi di ragno (The Path to the Nest of Spiders) written with valuable editorial advice from Pavese, won the Premio Riccione on publication in 1947. With sales topping 5000 copies, a surprise success in postwar Italy, the novel inaugurated Calvino's neorealist period. In a clairvoyant essay, Pavese praised the young writer as a "squirrel of the pen" who "climbed into the trees, more for fun than fear, to observe partisan life as a fable of the forest". In 1948, he interviewed one of his literary idols, Ernest Hemingway, travelling with Natalia Ginzburg to his home in Stresa.

Ultimo viene il corvo (The Crow Comes Last), a collection of stories based on his wartime experiences, was published to acclaim in 1949. Despite the triumph, Calvino grew increasingly worried by his inability to compose a worthy second novel. He returned to Einaudi in 1950, responsible this time for the literary volumes. He eventually became a consulting editor, a position that allowed him to hone his writing talent, discover new writers, and develop into "a reader of texts". In late 1951, presumably to advance in the Communist Party, he spent two months in the Soviet Union as correspondent for l'Unità. While in Moscow, he learned of his father's death on 25 October. The articles and correspondence he produced from this visit were published in 1952, winning the Saint-Vincent Prize for journalism.

Over a seven-year period, Calvino wrote three realist novels, The White Schooner (1947–1949), Youth in Turin (1950–1951), and The Queen's Necklace (1952–54), but all were deemed defective. Calvino's first efforts as a fictionist were marked with his experience in the Italian resistance during the Second World War, however his acclamation as a writer of fantastic stories came in the 1950s. During the eighteen months it took to complete I giovani del Po (Youth in Turin), he made an important self-discovery: "I began doing what came most naturally to me – that is, following the memory of the things I had loved best since boyhood. Instead of making myself write the book I ought to write, the novel that was expected of me, I conjured up the book I myself would have liked to read, the sort by an unknown writer, from another age and another country, discovered in an attic." The result was Il visconte dimezzato (1952; The Cloven Viscount) composed in 30 days between July and September 1951. The protagonist, a seventeenth century viscount sundered in two by a cannonball, incarnated Calvino's growing political doubts and the divisive turbulence of the Cold War. Skilfully interweaving elements of the fable and the fantasy genres, the allegorical novel launched him as a modern "fabulist". In 1954, Giulio Einaudi commissioned his Fiabe Italiane (1956; Italian Folktales) on the basis of the question, "Is there an Italian equivalent of the Brothers Grimm?" For two years, Calvino collated tales found in 19th century collections across Italy then translated 200 of the finest from various dialects into Italian.  Key works he read at this time were Vladimir Propp's Morphology of the Folktale and Historical Roots of Russian Fairy Tales, stimulating his own ideas on the origin, shape and function of the story.

In 1952 Calvino wrote with Giorgio Bassani for Botteghe Oscure, a magazine named after the popular name of the party's head-offices in Rome.  He also worked for Il Contemporaneo, a Marxist weekly.

From 1955 to 1958 Calvino had an affair with Italian actress Elsa De Giorgi, a married, older woman. Excerpts of the hundreds of love letters Calvino wrote to her were published in the Corriere della Sera in 2004, causing some controversy.

After communism
In 1957, disillusioned by the 1956 Soviet invasion of Hungary, Calvino left the Italian Communist Party. In his letter of resignation published in L'Unità on 7 August, he explained the reason of his dissent (the violent suppression of the Hungarian uprising and the revelation of Joseph Stalin's crimes) while confirming his "confidence in the democratic perspectives" of world Communism. He withdrew from taking an active role in politics and never joined another party. Ostracized by the PCI party leader Palmiro Togliatti and his supporters on publication of Becalmed in the Antilles (La gran bonaccia delle Antille), a satirical allegory of the party's immobilism, Calvino began writing The Baron in the Trees. Completed in three months and published in 1957, the fantasy is based on the "problem of the intellectual's political commitment at a time of shattered illusions". He found new outlets for his periodic writings in the journals Città aperta and Tempo presente, the magazine Passato e presente, and the weekly Italia Domani. With Vittorini in 1959, he became co-editor of 'Il Menabò, a cultural journal devoted to literature in the modern industrial age, a position he held until 1966.

Despite severe restrictions in the US against foreigners holding communist views, Calvino was allowed to visit the United States, where he stayed six months from 1959 to 1960 (four of which he spent in New York), after an invitation by the Ford Foundation. Calvino was particularly impressed by the "New World": "Naturally I visited the South and also California, but I always felt a New Yorker. My city is New York."  The letters he wrote to Einaudi describing this visit to the United States were first published as  "American Diary 1959–1960" in Hermit in Paris in 2003.

In 1962 Calvino met Argentinian translator Esther Judith Singer ("Chichita") and married her in 1964 in Havana, during a trip in which he visited his birthplace and was introduced to Ernesto "Che" Guevara. On 15 October 1967, a few days after Guevara's death, Calvino wrote a tribute to him that was published in Cuba in 1968, and in Italy thirty years later. He and his wife settled in Rome in the via Monte Brianzo where their daughter, Giovanna, was born in 1965. Once again working for Einaudi, Calvino began publishing some of his "Cosmicomics" in Il Caffè, a literary magazine.

Later life and work
Vittorini's death in 1966 greatly affected Calvino. He went through what he called an "intellectual depression", which the writer himself described as an important passage in his life: "I ceased to be young. Perhaps it's a metabolic process, something that comes with age, I'd been young for a long time, perhaps too long, suddenly I felt that I had to begin my old age, yes, old age, perhaps with the hope of prolonging it by beginning it early."

Amid the atmosphere that would evolve into 1968's cultural revolution (the French May), he and his family moved to Paris in 1967, taking up residence in a villa in the Square de Châtillon. Nicknamed l'ironique amusé, Calvino was invited by Raymond Queneau in 1968 to join the Oulipo (Ouvroir de littérature potentielle) group of experimental writers where he met Roland Barthes and Georges Perec, who would influence his later work. That same year, he turned down the Viareggio Prize for Ti con zero (Time and the Hunter) on the grounds that it was an award given by "institutions emptied of meaning". He accepted, however, both the Asti Prize and the Feltrinelli Prize for his writing in 1970 and 1972, respectively. In two autobiographical essays published in 1962 and 1970, Calvino described himself as "atheist" and his outlook as "non-religious".

Calvino had more significant contact with the academic world, notably at the Sorbonne (with Barthes) and the University of Urbino. His literary interests spanned multiple periods, genres, and languages, including Honoré de Balzac, Ludovico Ariosto, Dante, Ignacio de Loyola, Cervantes, Shakespeare, Cyrano de Bergerac, and Giacomo Leopardi. 

Between 1972 and 1973, Calvino published two short stories, "The Name, the Nose" and the Oulipo-inspired "The Burning of the Abominable House", in the Italian edition of Playboy. He also became a regular contributor to the Italian newspaper Corriere della Sera. During this period, Calvino spent his summer vacations in a house constructed in the pinewood of Roccamare, in Castiglione della Pescaia, Tuscany.

In 1975, Calvino was made Honorary Member of the American Academy. Awarded the Austrian State Prize for European Literature in 1976, he visited Mexico, Japan, and the United States, where he gave a series of lectures in several American towns. After his mother died in 1978 at the age of 92, Calvino sold Villa Meridiana, the family home in San Remo. Two years later, he moved to Rome in Piazza Campo Marzio near the Pantheon and began editing the work of Tommaso Landolfi for Rizzoli. Awarded the French Légion d'honneur in 1981, he also accepted the role of jury president for the 38th Venice Film Festival.

During the summer of 1985, Calvino prepared a series of texts on literature for the Charles Eliot Norton Lectures to be delivered at Harvard University in the fall. On 6 September, he was admitted to the hospital of Santa Maria della Scala in Siena (now a museum) where he died during the night between 18 and 19 September of a cerebral hemorrhage. His lecture notes were published posthumously in Italian in 1988 and in English as Six Memos for the Next Millennium in 1993.

Authors he helped publish 
 Mario Rigoni Stern
 Gianni Celati
 Andrea De Carlo
 Daniele Del Giudice
 Leonardo Sciascia

Selected bibliography 
A selected bibliography of Calvino's writings follows, listing the works that have been published in English translation, along with a few major untranslated works. More exhaustive bibliographies can be found in Martin McLaughlin's Italo Calvino and Beno Weiss's Understanding Italo Calvino.

Fiction

Fiction collections
{| class="wikitable" style="width:100%; margin:auto;"
|-
! Title !! Originalpublication !! Englishtranslation !! Translator

{{Book list
 | title            = Prima che tu dica 'Pronto | publish_date     = 1993
 | alt_title        = Numbers in the Dark and Other Stories
 | aux1             = 1996
 | aux2             = Tim Parks
 | short_summary    = 37 short stories: The Man Who Shouted Teresa; The Flash; Making Do; Dry River; Conscience; Solidarity; The Black Sheep; Good for Nothing; Like a Flight of Ducks; Love Far from Home; Wind in a City; The Lost Regiment; Enemy Eyes; A General in the Library; The Workshop Hen; Numbers in the Dark; The Queen's Necklace; Becalmed in the Antilles; The Tribe with Its Eyes on the Sky; Nocturnal Soliloquy of a Scottish Nobleman; A Beautiful March Day; World Memory; Beheading the Heads; The Burning of the Abominable House; The Petrol Pump; Neanderthal Man; Montezuma; Before You Say 'Hello'; Glaciation; The Call of the Water; The Mirror, the Target; The Other Eurydice; The Memoirs of Casanova; Henry Ford; The Last Channel; Implosion; Nothing and Not Much.
}}

|}

Essays and other writings

Autobiographical works

Libretti

Translations

Selected filmography
 Boccaccio '70, 1962 (co-wrote screenplay of "Renzo e Luciano" segment directed by Mario Monicelli)
 L'Amore difficile, 1963 (wrote "L'avventura di un soldato" segment directed by Nino Manfredi)
 Tiko and the Shark, 1964 (co-wrote screenplay directed by Folco Quilici)

 Film and television adaptations 
 The Nonexistent Knight by Pino Zac, 1969 (Italian animated film based on the novel)
 Amores dificiles by Ana Luisa Ligouri, 1983 (13' Mexican short)
 L'Aventure d'une baigneuse by Philippe Donzelot, 1991 (14' French short based on The Adventure of a Bather in Difficult Loves )
 Fantaghirò by Lamberto Bava, 1991 (TV adaptation based on  Fanta-Ghirò the Beautiful in Italian Folktales)
 Palookaville by Alan Taylor, 1995 (American film based on Theft in a Cake Shop, Desire in November, and Transit Bed)
Solidarity by Nancy Kiang, 2006 (10' American short)
 Conscience by Yu-Hsiu Camille Chen, 2009 (10' Australian short)
 "La Luna" by Enrico Casarosa, 2011 (American short)

 Films on Calvino 
 Damian Pettigrew, Lo specchio di Calvino (Inside Italo, 2012). Co-produced by Arte France, Italy's Ministero per i Beni e le Attività Culturali, and the National Film Board of Canada, the feature-length docufiction stars Neri Marcorè as the Italian writer and critic Pietro Citati. The film also uses in-depth conversations videotaped at Calvino's Rome penthouse a year before his death in 1985 and rare footage from RAI, INA (Institut national de l'audiovisuel), and BBC television archives. The 52-minute French version titled, Dans la peau d'Italo Calvino ("Being Italo Calvino"), was broadcast by Arte France on 19 December 2012 and Sky Arte (Italy) on 14 October 2013.

Legacy
The Scuola Italiana Italo Calvino, an Italian curriculum school in Moscow, Russia, is named after him. A crater on the planet Mercury, Calvino, and a main belt asteroid, 22370 Italocalvino, are also named after him. Salt Hill Journal and University of Louisville award annually the Italo Calvino Prize "for a work of fiction written in the fabulist experimental style of Italo Calvino". 

Kai Nieminen (b. 1953) wrote his flute concerto (2001) based on the story of Mr. Palomar. The text was written to the dedicatee, Patrick Gallois.

 Awards 
 1946 – L'Unità Prize (shared with Marcello Venturi) for the short story, Minefield (Campo di mine)
 1947 – Riccione Prize for The Path to the Nest of Spiders
 1952 – Saint-Vincent Prize
 1957 – Viareggio Prize for The Baron in the Trees
 1959 – Bagutta Prize
 1960 – Salento Prize for Our Ancestors
 1963 – International Charles Veillon Prize for The Watcher
 1970 – Asti Prize
 1972 – Feltrinelli Prize for Invisible Cities
 1976 – Austrian State Prize for European Literature
 1981 – Legion of Honour
 1982 – World Fantasy Award – Life Achievement

Notes

Sources

Primary sources
Calvino, Italo. Adam, One Afternoon (trans. Archibald Colquhoun, Peggy Wright). London: Minerva, 1992.
—. The Castle of Crossed Destinies (trans.  William Weaver). London: Secker & Warburg, 1977
—. Cosmicomics (trans. William Weaver). London: Picador, 1993.
—. The Crow Comes Last (Ultimo viene il corvo). Turin: Einaudi, 1949.
—. Difficult Loves. Smog. A Plunge into Real Estate (trans. William Weaver, Donald Selwyn Carne-Ross). London: Picador, 1985.
—. Hermit in Paris (trans. Martin McLaughlin). London: Jonathan Cape, 2003.
—. If on a winter's night a traveller (trans. William Weaver). London: Vintage, 1998. 
—. Invisible Cities (trans. William Weaver). London: Secker & Warburg, 1974.
—. Italian Fables (trans. Louis Brigante). New York: Collier, 1961. (50 tales)
—. Italian Folk Tales (trans. Sylvia Mulcahy). London: J.M. Dent & Sons, 1975. (24 tales)
—. Italian Folktales (trans.  George Martin). Harmondsworth: Penguin, 1980. (complete 200 tales)
—. Marcovaldo or the Seasons in the City (trans. William Weaver). London: Minerva, 1993.
—. Mr. Palomar (trans. William Weaver). London: Vintage, 1999.
—. Our Ancestors (trans. A. Colquhoun). London: Vintage, 1998.
—. The Path to the Nest of Spiders (trans. Archibald Colquhoun). Boston: Beacon, 1957.
—. The Path to the Spiders' Nests (trans. A. Colquhoun, revised by Martin McLaughlin). London: Jonathan Cape, 1993.
—. t zero (trans. William Weaver).  New York: Harcourt, Brace & World, 1969.
—. The Road to San Giovanni (trans. Tim Parks). New York: Vintage International, 1993.
—. Six Memos for the Next Millennium (trans. Patrick Creagh). New York: Vintage International, 1993.
—. The Watcher and Other Stories (trans. William Weaver). New York: Harcourt, Brace & Company, 1971.

Secondary sources
 Barenghi, Mario, and Bruno Falcetto. Romanzi e racconti di Italo Calvino. Milano: Mondadori, 1991.
 Bernardini Napoletano, Francesca. I segni nuovi di Italo Calvino. Rome: Bulzoni, 1977.
 Bonura, Giuseppe. Invito alla lettura di Calvino. Milan: U. Mursia, 1972.
 Calvino, Italo. Uno scrittore pomeridiano: Intervista sull'arte della narrativa a cura di William Weaver e Damian Pettigrew con un ricordo di Pietro Citati. Rome: minimum fax, 2003. .
 Corti, Maria. 'Intervista: Italo Calvino' in Autografo 2 (October 1985): 47–53.
 Di Carlo, Franco. Come leggere I nostri antenati. Milan: U. Mursia, 1958. (1998 ).
 McLaughlin, Martin. Italo Calvino. Edinburgh: Edinburgh University Press, 1998.  (pb. ).
 Weiss, Beno. Understanding Italo Calvino. Columbia: University of South Carolina Press, 1993. .
 Anderson, Helen Victoria. Historical and detective fiction in Italy 1950-2006 : Calvino, Malerba and Mancinelli. Oxford University, 2010.

 Online sources  
 Italo Calvino at Emory University Online Resources and Links
 Outside the Town of Malbork A Site for Italo Calvino
 The Words that Failed Calvino on Che Guevara
http://atlantecalvino.unige.ch/ vizualisation of Calvino's work by 

Further readingGeneral'''
Benussi, Cristina (1989). Introduzione a Calvino. Rome: Laterza.
 Bartoloni, Paolo (2003). Interstitial Writing: Calvino, Caproni, Sereni and Svevo. Leicester: Troubador.
 Bloom, Harold (ed.)(2002). Bloom's Major Short Story Writers: Italo Calvino. Broomall, Pennsylvania: Chelsea House.
 Bolongaro, Eugenio (2003).  Italo Calvino and the Compass of Literature. Toronto: University of Toronto Press.
 Cannon, JoAnn (1981). Italo Calvino: Writer and Critic. Ravenna: Longo Press.
 Carter III, Albert Howard (1987). Italo Calvino: Metamorphoses of Fantasy. Ann Arbor, Michigan: UMI Research Press.
 Chubb, Stephen (1997). I, Writer, I, Reader: the Concept of the Self in the Fiction of Italo Calvino. Leicester: Troubador.
 Gabriele, Tomassina (1994). Italo Calvino: Eros and Language. Teaneck, N.J.: Fairleigh Dickinson University Press.
 Jeannet, Angela M. (2000) Under the Radiant Sun and the Crescent Moon. Toronto: University of Toronto Press.
 Markey, Constance (1999). Italo Calvino. A Journey Toward Postmodernism. Gainesville: Florida University Press.
 —. Interview. "Italo Calvino: The Contemporary Fabulist" in Italian Quarterly, 23 (spring 1982): 77–85.
 Pilz, Kerstin (2005). Mapping Complexity: Literature and Science in the Works of Italo Calvino. Leicester: Troubador.

 External links 

 Italo Calvino at Emory University On-Line Resources and Links
 Outside the Town of Malbork A Site for Italo Calvino
 
 
 

Excerpts, essays, artwork
 The Distance of the Moon read by Liev Schreiber in 2013
 If on a winter's night a traveler  First chapter excerpts
  Chapter 8 of Cosmicomics''
 Calvino on Myth
 Calvino on Che Guevara
 In Calvino veritas Essays on Calvino

Italo Calvino
1923 births
1985 deaths
20th-century Italian novelists
20th-century Italian short story writers
20th-century male writers
Collectors of fairy tales
Italian atheists
Italian communists
Italian folklorists
Italian male journalists
Italian magazine editors
Italian male novelists
Italian male short story writers
Italian resistance movement members
Recipients of the Legion of Honour
Magic realism writers
Oulipo members
Postmodern writers
The New Yorker people
University of Florence alumni
University of Paris people
University of Turin alumni
Viareggio Prize winners
World Fantasy Award-winning writers
Writers from Havana
Cuban emigrants to Italy
Italian science fiction writers
Italian magazine founders